Laubuka insularis, is a cyprinid fish in the family Cyprinidae, which is endemic to island Sri Lanka. It is a freshwater species, that is confined to rivers and streams running through the Knuckles Mountain Range in Sri Lanka.

References

Laubuka
Fish of Asia
Taxa named by Rohan Pethiyagoda
Taxa named by Maurice Kottelat
Taxa named by Anjana Silva
Taxa named by Kalana Maduwage
Taxa named by Madhava Meegaskumbura
Fish described in 2008